The love that dare not speak its name is a phrase from the last line of the poem "Two Loves" by Lord Alfred Douglas, written in September 1892 and published in the Oxford magazine The Chameleon in December 1894.

In Wilde's definition, "the love that dare not speak its name" was:

See also

 The Love That Dares to Speak Its Name, a 1976 poem by James Kirkup

References

1890s neologisms
Quotations from literature
English phrases
LGBT linguistics
Oscar Wilde